The Rifles is a 1994 novel by American writer William T. Vollmann. It is intended to be the sixth book in a planned seven-book cycle entitled Seven Dreams: A Book of North American Landscapes. As of 2015 five of the seven have been published, The Rifles being the third to reach print.

Unlike the other books in this series so far, The Rifles is not wholly a historical novel, as it primarily takes place in the early 1990s, although the storyline depicting the trials and challenges of modern Inuit life is tied to the ill-fated exploration of the Arctic region by Sir John Franklin in the mid-19th century.  The novel also discusses the 1955 forced migration of Inuit from Inukjuak, Quebec to Resolute, Nunavut.

References

External links
Time on "The Rifles"

1994 American novels
Novels set in the Northwest Territories
Viking Press books
Works by William T. Vollmann
American historical novels